Lev Alekseyevich Lobodin (born April 1, 1969 in Voronezh) is a male decathlete from Russia, having changed nationality from Ukraine at the end of 1996. His best achievement was the silver medal at the 2003 World Indoor Championships in Birmingham.

Achievements

Personal bests 
 100 metres - 10.66 (2001)
 400 metres - 48.39 (1996)
 1500 metres - 4:29.95 (1991)
 110 metres hurdles - 13.94 (1999)
 High jump - 2.10 (1991)
 Pole vault - 5.20 (1998, 2001)
 Long jump - 7.56 (1999)
 Shot put - 16.30 (2002)
 Discus throw - 49.44 (2002)
 Javelin throw - 59.00 (1995)
 Decathlon 8571 - (1998)

External links 
 

Ukrainian decathletes
Russian decathletes
1969 births
Living people
Athletes (track and field) at the 1996 Summer Olympics
Athletes (track and field) at the 2000 Summer Olympics
Athletes (track and field) at the 2004 Summer Olympics
Olympic athletes of Russia
Olympic athletes of Ukraine
World record holders in masters athletics
European Athletics Championships medalists
Sportspeople from Voronezh
Competitors at the 2001 Goodwill Games